Elections to the United States House of Representatives in Florida were held on November 6, 1894, for two seats in the 54th Congress.

Background
In the previous election, the Republican Party had not run any candidates in Florida, with the Democratic Party having been dominant in the state since 1884.  A new party, the People's Party, also known as Populist Party, ran its first candidate that year as the only opposition to the Democrats.  The Populists would continue to be the only opposition party to the Democrats in Florida's congressional elections in 1894 as well.

Election results
Stephen Mallory, Jr. did not seek renomination in the 1st district.

See also
United States House of Representatives elections, 1894

References

1894
Florida
United States House of Representatives